Kiberi Forest Park is a forest park in the Gambia. It covers 389 hectares.

Park has an elevation of 36 metres.

References

Forest parks of the Gambia